Aliaga, officially the Municipality of Aliaga (Ilocano: Ili ti Aliaga), is a 2nd class municipality in the province of Nueva Ecija, Philippines. According to the 2020 census, it has a population of 70,363 people.

History
Originally known as Pulong Bibit, Aliaga became a town on February 8, 1849, and named after the Spanish hometown of its first gobernadorcillo, Aniceto Pere. It once included the present-day municipalities of Zaragoza, Quezon, and Licab.

Geography
It has a comparatively cool and healthful climate, and is situated about midway between the Pampanga Grande and the Pampanga Chico rivers, in a large and fertile valley. Historically, the principal products were mostly agricultural such as rice, tomato, eggplant, squash.

Barangays
Aliaga is politically subdivided into 26 barangays.

 Betes
 Bibiclat
 Bucot
 La Purisima
 Magsaysay
 Macabucod
 Pantoc
 Poblacion Centro
 Poblacion East I
 Poblacion East II
 Poblacion West III
 Poblacion West IV
 San Carlos
 San Emiliano
 San Eustacio
 San Felipe Bata
 San Felipe Matanda
 San Juan
 San Pablo Bata
 San Pablo Matanda
 Santa Monica
 Santiago
 Santo Rosario
 Santo Tomas
 Sunson
 Umangan

Climate

Demographics

Tagalog and Ilocano are the most important and the major languages of the municipality.

Economy

Culture
The Taong Putik Festival is an annual festival held in the municipality on the feast day of Saint John the Baptist every 24th day of June.  The religious festival is celebrated by the locals and devotees to pay homage to Saint John the Baptist by wearing costumes patterned from his attire. Devotees soak themselves in mud and cover their body with dried banana leaves and visit houses or ask people for alms in the form of candles or money to buy candles which is them offered to Saint John the Baptist.

Sister cities
 Cabanatuan, Nueva Ecija

References

External links

 [ Philippine Standard Geographic Code]
Philippine Census Information
Local Governance Performance Management System

Municipalities of Nueva Ecija